Odostomia eldorana is a species of sea snail, a marine gastropod mollusc in the family Pyramidellidae, the pyrams and their allies.

Description
The wax-yellow shell has an elongate, conic shape. It measures 9 mm. (The nuclear whorls are decollated). The 4½ post-nuclear whorls are moderately well rounded, slightly constricted at the sutures and feebly roundly shouldered at the summit. They are marked with lines of growth and very fine spiral striations. The periphery of the body whorl is well rounded. The base of the shell is slightly protracted, well rounded, very narrowly umbilicated. The aperture is elongate ovate. The posterior angle is acute. The outer lip is  thin at the edge. The inner lip is very oblique, somewhat sinuous, reflected over and adnate to the base. It is provided with a moderately strong fold, a little anterior to its insertion. The parietal wall is closed by a very thin callus.

Distribution
The type specimen was found off Kodiak Island, Alaska.

References

External links
 To World Register of Marine Species

eldorana
Gastropods described in 1912